is the Latin gradual for the anniversary of the dedication of a church , which in German is called . The incipit  translates to "This place was made by God". One of the most famous settings is by the Austrian composer Anton Bruckner.

Text 

The text is based on the Biblical story of Jacob's Ladder, Jacob's saying "Surely the Lord is in this place; and I knew it not", and the story of the burning bush where Moses is told "put off thy shoes from off thy feet, for the place whereon thou standest is holy ground".

A translation closer to the Latin is:

Plainchant 
The plainchant of the gradual appears in the Liber Usualis at p. 1064 of the 1924 edition (modern notation) and p. 1251 of the 1961 edition (chant notation).

Bruckner's setting 

Bruckner completed the motet for unaccompanied SATB choir in 1869 for the dedication of a votive chapel at the New Cathedral in Linz. The motet is often performed on anniversaries of church dedication. The piece, which takes about three minutes to perform, is in the key of C major and in common time.

References

External links 
Libera (choir):
Locus Iste (video); Libera Official, 2009 (Youtube).
Locus Iste (Visions; music); Libera Official, 2016 (Youtube).
Locus Iste by Libera (lyrics & translation); Youtube, 2016.

Latin-language Christian hymns